People with the surname Bongiorno include:

 Annette Bongiorno, see Participants in the Madoff investment scandal
 Bernard Bongiorno, Australian professor and former Court of Appeal justice
 Carmelo Bongiorno, Italian photographer
 Francesco Manuel Bongiorno (born 1990), Italian racing cyclist
 Frank Bongiorno (born 1969), Australian historian, academic and author
 Giulia Bongiorno (born 1966) is an Italian lawyer and politician
 Guillermo Bongiorno (born 1978), Argentine former professional cyclist
 Leigh Bongiorno (born 1987), an American figurative artist
 María José Bongiorno, Argentine politician
 Marylou and Jerome Bongiorno, American filmmakers
 Mike Bongiorno (1924–2009), Italian television presenter
 Paul Bongiorno (born 1944), Australian political journalist and commentator
 Vito Bongiorno, Italian artist
 Vittorio Bongiorno (born 1973), Italian writer and musician